Tumut was an electoral district for the Legislative Assembly in the Australian state of New South Wales in the Tumut area, one of 62 new districts established under the Electoral Act 1858 (NSW), in the 1858 redistribution. It replaced part of the district of Murrumbidgee which was reduced from 2 to 1 member. It was abolished in 1904 and replaced by Wynyard.

Members for Tumut

Election results

Notes

References

Former electoral districts of New South Wales
Constituencies established in 1859
1859 establishments in Australia
Constituencies disestablished in 1904
1904 disestablishments in Australia